Oreolalax major (common lazy toad or large toothed toad) is a species of amphibian in the family Megophryidae.
It is endemic to China and found in Sichuan and Yunnan provinces, between Mount Emei and Hengduan Mountains. It likely exists in Emeishan, Wawushan, Gonggashan, Wolong, and Dujiangyan National Nature Reserves.
Its natural habitats are subtropical moist montane forests and rivers.
It is threatened by habitat loss.

References

major
Amphibians of China
Endemic fauna of China
Taxonomy articles created by Polbot
Amphibians described in 1960